Murieje is a town and commune, located in the province of Lunda Sul, Angola.

See also 

 Communes of Angola

References 

Populated places in Lunda Sul Province